The Technological Educational Institute of Crete (TEI CRETE) was founded in 1983 to provide higher technological education to the students of Greece. It is located in Heraklion and has branches in other towns of Crete, Chania, Rethymnon, Ierapetra, Sitia and Agios Nikolaos.

According to laws Ν.2916/2001, Ν.3549/2007, Ν.3685/2008, Ν.3794/2009, it is a higher educational institute (Greek: Α.Ε.Ι.) with full University status. The TEI of Crete abolished in May 2019 by law 4610, article 23, Government Gazette 70 A'/07.05.2019, and founding the newly established Hellenic Mediterranean University (HMU) in Crete (Greek: Ελληνικό Μεσογειακό Πανεπιστήμιο).

Overview
TEI Crete, with its 400 teaching staff and technical and clerical staff, provides education to more than 14,500 students. Education is delivered at the base campus in Heraklion city and at five branches in towns of Crete (Chania, Rethymnon, Aghios Nicolaos, Ierapetra and Siteia). Degree Courses comprise Engineering and Informatics, Business Administration and Economics, Agriculture, Health and Welfare.

The Institute and Schools administration concentrate of the efficacy of the study programmes, learning outcomes, publicity of the degrees, successful graduate placements, the student halls and the six restaurants of the Institute. Local communities fully support the branches of the Institute and the resident students. There are opportunities for active student participation in research and development projects, for student exchanges with over 100 foreign universities and for paid work at the Institute laboratories. Graduates can also continue with Postgraduate Studies at the Institute or at cooperating Universities in Greece and abroad, with the active support of TEI Crete professors.

Spiritual, artistic and entertainment activities in and around the Institute are varied and shared by students and staff, with the financial support of TEI Crete. Personal care and advice is provided to new incoming students by the International Office and skilled staff at the Schools.

Schools and departments
The university includes five Schools, consisting of fifteen Departments, to be reduced to thirteen by 2018.

Language of instruction
The language of instruction at the TEI is Greek. Therefore, a good knowledge of Greek is essential for regular students. However, special arrangements are made for a certain number of courses for Erasmus students who wish to follow regular courses. After consultation with the teaching staff, students can register for certain courses, must study from English literature, and will be given a separate examination at the end of the term. Additionally, a few courses are taught in English, and there are plans for more.

Academic evaluation
In 2016 the external evaluation committee gave Agricultural University of Athens a Positive evaluation.

An external evaluation of all academic departments in Greek universities was conducted by the Hellenic Quality Assurance and Accreditation Agency (HQA).

Erasmus
TEI of Crete has always welcomed foreign students, participating in all major European programmes (Socrates, Erasmus, Leonardo da Vinci, Tempus, Alpha, EC/US and others). The ECTS grading system and the Diploma Supplement (DS) have been successfully implemented in all of their Departments and facilitate the recognition of studies for both incoming and outgoing students. Today it is cooperating with more than a hundred and fifty foreign Universities and other Institutions in Europe, Asia and the United States.

See also 
 University of Crete / Technical University of Crete
 Technological Educational Institute (TEI)
 List of research institutes in Greece
 Academic grading in Greece
 List of universities in Greece
 Fachhochschule (FH)
 Education in Greece

References

External links 
 TEI of Crete - Official Webpage 
 Hellenic Quality Assurance and Accreditation Agency (HQA) 

Education in Crete
Crete
Educational institutions established in 1983
1983 establishments in Greece